Jelle Vossen (born 22 March 1989) is a Belgian professional footballer who plays as a striker for Belgian First Division A club Zulte Waregem.

Club career

RC Genk 
Vossen was part of a last minute transfer deal in the late evening of 31 August 2009. Cercle Brugge and RC Genk came to an agreement in which Vossen was loaned to Cercle Brugge and his teammate Hans Cornelis joined Brugge in a permanent move. Thomas Buffel went in the opposite direction, joining Genk from Cercle Brugge. In the summer of 2010, Vossen rejoined Genk.

Middlesbrough 
On 1 September 2014, it was announced that Vossen had joined English Championship club Middlesbrough on a season long loan from Genk with a view to a permanent £3million transfer at the end of the season.

Vossen made his Middlesbrough debut in a 2–1 win against Huddersfield Town on 13 September 2014 coming on as a substitute for Lee Tomlin in the 59th minute. Vossen scored his first goals for the Teesside club, hitting a 45-minute hat-trick in a 5–1 away win against Millwall.

Burnley 

On 6 July 2015 it was confirmed that Burnley had signed Vossen on a three-year deal for an undisclosed fee. On 8 August 2015, on the opening day of the English Championship 2015/16 season, Vossen made his Burnley debut against Leeds United in a 1–1 draw.

Club Brugge 
On 30 August 2015, despite spending less than two months under contract at Burnley, Vossen signed a five-year contract at Club Brugge.

On 23 September 2016, Vossen scored his 100th goal in the Belgian Pro League in a game against Mouscron.

Zulte Waregem
Vossen joined Zulte Waregem on 30 January 2020, signing a three-and-a-half-year deal. On 13 March 2022, Vossen scored his 150th goal in the Belgian Pro League, slotting home a penalty-kick against Eupen. His goal also meant that he became a top-ten goalscorer in Belgian top division history since turning professional in 1974.

International career 
Vossen was called up for Belgium's Kirin Cup matches against Chile and Japan. As from 2010, he is often called for the national team together with his co-attacker from Genk Marvin Ogunjimi. On 12 October 2010, Vossen scored his first goal in a 4–4 home draw Euro 2012 qualifying game against Austria.

International goals
Scores and results list Belgium's goal tally first.

Career statistics

Club

International

Honours 
Genk
Belgian Pro League: 2010–11
Belgian Cup: 2008–09, 2012–13
Belgian Super Cup: 2011

Club Brugge
Belgian Pro League: 2015–16, 2017–18
Belgian Super Cup: 2016, 2018

References

External links 
 
 
 
 

1989 births
Living people
Belgian footballers
Belgian expatriate footballers
Belgium youth international footballers
Belgium under-21 international footballers
Belgium international footballers
Association football forwards
K.R.C. Genk players
Cercle Brugge K.S.V. players
Middlesbrough F.C. players
Burnley F.C. players
Club Brugge KV players
S.V. Zulte Waregem players
Belgian Pro League players
English Football League players
Expatriate footballers in England
Belgian expatriate sportspeople in England
People from Bilzen
Footballers from Limburg (Belgium)